The following are the national records in athletics in South Korea maintained by the Korean Association of Athletics Federations (KAAF).

Outdoor

Key to tables:

+ = en route to a longer distance

A = affected by altitude

dh = downhill course

Men

Women

Indoor

Men

Women

Notes

References
General
South Korean Records - Outdoor 1 August 2021 updated
Specific

External links
 KAAF web site

South Korea
Records
Athletics
Athletics